Winona Ryder is an American actress who is known for taking on challenging roles in her earlier films, after which she went on to play more prominent roles in the 1990s. After Ryder's film debut in  Lucas (1986), she gained attention with her performance in Tim Burton's Beetlejuice (1988). She further rose to prominence with major roles in Heathers (1988), Mermaids (1990), Edward Scissorhands (1990), and Bram Stoker's Dracula (1992). She garnered critical acclaim and two consecutive Academy Award nominations for her portrayals of socialite May Welland in Martin Scorsese's The Age of Innocence (1993) and Jo March in the fifth film adaptation of Little Women (1994). Her other films during this period were Reality Bites (1994),  How to Make an American Quilt (1995), The Crucible (1996), Alien Resurrection (1997), Celebrity (1999), and Girl, Interrupted (1999), which she also executive-produced.

In 2002, Ryder starred in the critically panned box office hit Mr. Deeds, after which her career declined and she took a break from films. In 2009, she returned in the high-profile film Star Trek. In 2010, she was nominated for two Screen Actors Guild Awards: as the lead actress in the television film When Love Is Not Enough: The Lois Wilson Story and as part of the cast of Black Swan. She also reunited with Burton for Frankenweenie (2012). She has starred as Joyce Byers in the Netflix science fiction horror series Stranger Things (2016–present), for which she has received Golden Globe and Screen Actors Guild nominations; and in 2020, she starred in the HBO drama miniseries The Plot Against America.

Filmography

Film

Television

Music videos

See also
 List of awards and nominations received by Winona Ryder

References

American filmographies
Actress filmographies